Stylobates calcifer is a species of carcinoecium-forming sea anemone in Japan. S. calcifer produces carcinoecium that forms a thin cover around the hermit crab species Pagurodofleinia doederleini. P. deoderleini shares a symbiotic relationship with S. calcifer. S. calcifer inhabits the top of the hermit crab's shell attaching itself by the carcinoecium it produces. The anemone feeds on the suspended particulates of organic matter from the water column or the food residuals. It lives at a depth of  around the Pacific side of Kyushu, Japan.

References 

Actiniidae